Lantz carnivals  are the traditional carnivals of Lantz, Navarre, Spain. This traditional celebration it’s made the day before Ash Wednesday. Monday and Tuesday of Carnival, streets are filled by people who dress up of different character. The aim is to capture the thief, Miel Otxin.

Characters

The main characters are:

 Miel Otxin: Miel Otxin is a huge doll; it’s believed it was a bad reputation thief of the region. It is also believed to be a representation of the evil spirit. On Sunday, the boys (now the girls too) prepare and they tend to adapt it. The doll is full of straw and a boy who plays the bagpipe and the Basque whistle makes it dance around the streets.
 Ziripot:Ziripots body is covered with saddle-bags full of straw and walks hopeless using a long stick. He covered his face, and wears a hat which gives the appearance of a woman (not always). He has been also called “Ziri-potolo”. With Zaldiko and Mielotxin, they walk around the street. When Zaldiko attacks him, he falls, so the other characters have to help him to stand up.

According to the fable, Ziripot was a beggar who tells stories, but Zaldiko and Miel Otxin steal what he earns. Annoyed, Ziripot invented terrible matters of Zaldiko and Miel Otxin and he began to tell them to the people from the town. Residents hearing these passages, they capture Miel Otxin and Zaldiko ande decided to burn them. They say that Ziripot repentant, run away from Lantz.

 Zaldiko: Zaldiko goes on a wooden horse. Zaldiko's function is to escape from being tamed and iron-shod. In addition, he puts all his strength on pushing and throwing Ziripot He also pushes and shoo people who is around him.
 Arotzak:They are responsible of putting to Zaldiko the horseshoe.
 Txatxoak: The Txatxos performed the population from Lantz and they wear animal fur and old clothes.

Gallery

References 
.

See also
 Inauteriak Euskal Herrian

Carnivals in Spain
Navarre culture